The Thailand women's national under-16 basketball team is the national basketball team of Thailand for Junior Women, governed by the Basketball Sport Association of Thailand.
It represents the country in international under-16 women's basketball competitions.

See also
Thailand women's national basketball team
Thailand women's national under-19 basketball team

References

Women's national under-16 basketball teams
U
national